Yalak is a rural locality (a selo) in Akhtynsky District, Republic of Dagestan, Russia. The population was 586 as of 2012.

Geography 
Yalak is located 21 km northwest of Akhty (the district's administrative centre) by road. Khryug is the nearest rural locality.

References 

Rural localities in Akhtynsky District